Arippu Fort (also known as Allirani fort) was built by the Portuguese and was handed over to the Dutch in 1658. The fort is nearly square in shape, with two bastions.

Robert Knox, English sea captain and famous British prisoner of the Kandyan King Rajasinghe II, and his companion escaped after nineteen years of captivity and reached the Arippu Fort in 1679.

The first British Governor of Ceylon, Frederick North, constructed his official summer residence at the beach front, now known as The Doric and converted the fort into accommodation for the officers, who operated the pearl fisheries in the area. The fort building was subsequently converted to a guest house but was abandoned when the civil war spread to the area.

History 
A legend says the Tamil Queen Alli Raani ruled in Mannar region. It believes that her fortress was located where the ruins of fort can be seen today. Further, the legend says that Kudiramalai area was her palace, and Queen Alli ruled where Kuveni subsequently ruled.

References 

 

British forts in Sri Lanka
Dutch forts in Sri Lanka
Forts in Northern Province, Sri Lanka
Portuguese forts in Sri Lanka
1658 establishments in the Dutch Empire